Majagual is a small town behind Los Haitises National Park. The town was founded during the 1930s by immigrant families from el Cibao.But there are evidence of settlement going back hundred of year, Taino cave and ornament are found by farmer working the land. There are Fiesta Patronales( Village Festival) on the 10 of March every year, many Majagualeños that live abroad in the U.S travel to this remote town to celebrate. 

The town has a clinic, hotel, store, police station and a school. Many of it resident have immigrate abroad to the US and Europe but they still maintain a strong connection to the town and help the population that remain behind. Many of the town's young residents attend college in the capital of Santo Domingo, transportation is provided by the local government. the town is divided into 6 neighborhoods, these are Sector Deportivo, Higuerito, San Jose, Las Flores, Rinconsolo and El Grillo. 

Highway 7 or Carretera Juan Pablo II cross this once inaccessible mountain town, There are dirt road that lead inside the Haitise national Park, good for mountain biking and horse riding.

Local economic is cattle ranching and dairy product, there used to be a farming communities, but the government took the land from the farmer and convert it into extension of the Haitises national park.

External links 
Towns near Majagual Municipal District are:
 La Pista
 La China 
 Juan Sanchez
 La Altagracia 
 Piraco
 La Charca
 Batey Nuevo
 Manati

References

Populated places in Monte Plata Province